Wenceslaus II, Duke of Opava-Ratibor (also known as Wenceslaus I of Ratibor and Krnov; ;  – 29 October 1456) was a member of the Opavian branch of the Přemyslid dynasty.  He was Duke of Ratibor and Kronov jointly with his brother Nicholas V from 1424 to 1437 and the sole Duke of Ratibor from 1437 until his death.

Life 
His parents were John II "the Iron" and his wife Helen of Lithuania, a niece of  King Jogaila of Poland.  Wenceslaus fought together with his father and other Silesian princes on the Polish side against the Teutonic Knights in the Hunger War in 1414.

Although Wenceslaus and his older brother Nicholas V were probably already adults when their father died in 1424, their mother, Helen of Lithuania, acted as regent until 1428.  From 1428 to 1449, she styled herself as Lady of Pleß; presumably Pleß was her Wittum.  From 1428 to 1437, Wenceslaus and Nicholas V ruled their territory jointly.  In 1437, it was divided, with Wenceslaus taking Ratibor and Nicholas taking Duchy of Krnov, Bruntál, Rybnik, Pleß and Baborów.

In late 1437, a majority of the Bohemian Estates elected Albert II from the House of Habsburg as the new King of Bohemia.  A minority favoured his eleven-year-old rival Casimir, the son of King Jogaila of Poland.  In 1438, Poland invaded Silesia and devastated the Duchies of Opole and Ratibor.  After this, Duke Wenceslaus of Ratibor, as well as Duke Wenceslaus I of Zator and his brothers Duke Przemysław of Toszek and Duke Jan IV of Oświęcim, were willing to accept Casimir as King, under certain conditions.  Nevertheless, all Silesian Dukes paid homage to Albert II in Wrocław in November 1438.

After Nicholas V died in 1452, Wenceslaus took up the guardianship over his underage sons John IV "the Elder" and Wenceslaus III, jointly with their step-mother, Barbara Rockenberg, until 1464.  From 1452 to 1462, she styled herself Lady of Pleß; presumably Pleß was her Wittum.

Duke Wenceslaus of Ratibor died in 1456 and was buried in the church of the Dominican monastery at Ratibor.

Marriage and issue 
In 1437, Wencelsaus married Margaret (d. 1464), a daughter of  Vincent of Szamotuły, Castellan of Międzyrzecz and widow of Casimir II of Belz.  They had the following children:
 John III "the Younger" (d. 1493), married  to Magdalena (d. 1501), daughter of Duke Nicholas I of Opole
 Catherine (d. 1480), married Władisław of Danaborz (d. 1467)
 Helena (d. 1480), married John of Ostroróg (d. 1501), Palatine of Poznań
 Anna (d. 1480)

References 
 Ludwig Petry and Josef Joachim Menzel (eds.): Geschichte Schlesiens vol. 1: Von der Urzeit bis zum Jahre 1526, 5th revised edition, Thorbecke, Stuttgart, 1988, pp. 188, 191, 201 ff and 218
 Hugo Weczerka (ed.): Handbuch der historischen Stätten — Schlesien, in the series Kröners Taschenausgabe, vol. 316, Kröner, Stuttgart 1977, genealogical tables at p. 600/601

External links

Footnotes 

Opavian Přemyslids
1405 births
1456 deaths
15th-century Polish people